Soybean dwarf virus (SbDV) is a pathogenic plant virus which infects soybeans.

See also 
 List of soybean diseases

References

External links
ICTVdB - The Universal Virus Database: Soybean dwarf virus
Family Groups - The Baltimore Method

Viral plant pathogens and diseases
Soybean diseases